Fanandrana is a rural commune in the district of Toamasina II (district), in the region of Atsinanana, on the east coast of Madagascar.
It is situated at the National road RN 2 at 26 km from Toamasina. The Ivondro River flows through the center of Fanandrana, and the Fanandrana river in its south.

Economy
The economy is based on agriculture. Rice is grown, other crops are oil palms, manioc, cloves, sugar cane and pepper.

Education
Schooling rate is 77.12%.

References

Populated places in Atsinanana